The Miss North Dakota competition is the pageant that selects the representative for the state of North Dakota in the Miss America pageant. The first Miss North Dakota to compete at Miss America was Kitty Page in 1949.  In 2017, Cara Mund became the first North Dakotan to win the Miss America title, when she won the Miss America 2018 pageant.

Sidni Kast of Minot was crowned Miss North Dakota on June 11, 2022, at Bakken Auditorium in Williston, North Dakota. She competed for the title of Miss America 2023 at the Mohegan Sun in Uncasville, Connecticut in December 2022.

Gallery of past titleholders

Results summary
The following is a visual summary of the past results of Miss North Dakota titleholders at the national Miss America pageants/competitions. The year in parentheses indicates the year of the national competition during which a placement and/or award was garnered, not the year attached to the contestant's state title.

Placements
 Miss America: Cara Mund (2018)
 Top 10: Donna Grotberg (1977), Tina Curran (1989), Roxana Saberi (1998)
 Top 16: Jacky Arness (2015)

Awards

Preliminary awards
 Preliminary Talent: Karen Kopseng (1965), Rosie Sauvageau (2013)

Non-finalist awards
 Non-finalist Talent: Joan Teets (1950), Margaret Aandahl (1953), Claudia Gullickson (1960), Denise Fledderman (1967), Georgia Ann Becker (1973), Daureen Podenski (1980), Rosie Sauvageau (2013)

Other awards
 Miss Congeniality: Ashley Young (2008), Jacky Arness (2015)
 Miss America Scholar: Roxana Saberi (1998)
 Quality of Life Award 1st runners-up: Cara Mund (2018)

Winners

References

External links
 Miss North Dakota official website

North Dakota
North Dakota culture
Women in North Dakota